Lasionycta subfuscula is a moth of the family Noctuidae. It is found from south-western British Columbia and south-western Alberta south to southern Oregon in the west and to southern Colorado and Utah in the Rocky Mountains.

It is found in the transition zone and subalpine forests.

Adults are on wing from mid-June to early September.

Subspecies
Lasionycta subfuscula subfuscula (from the Wind River Mountains of Wyoming and southeastern Idaho to southern Colorado and Utah)
Lasionycta subfuscula livida (from southwestern British Columbia and extreme southwestern Alberta to southern Oregon)

External links
A Revision of Lasionycta Aurivillius (Lepidoptera, Noctuidae) for North America and notes on Eurasian species, with descriptions of 17 new species, 6 new subspecies, a new genus, and two new species of Tricholita Grote

Lasionycta
Moths of North America
Moths described in 1874